The Oath of Fidelity and Support was an oath swearing allegiance to the state of Maryland and denying allegiance and obedience to Great Britain during the American Revolutionary War.  As enacted by the Maryland General Assembly in 1777, all persons holding any office of profit or trust, including attorneys at law, and all voters were required to take the oath no later than March 1, 1778.  It was signed by residents of every county, including 3,136 residents of Montgomery and Washington counties, and 9,000 residents of the Eastern Shore.

Being a direct female descendant of a signer of the oath is sufficient condition to join the Daughters of the American Revolution.

Being a direct male descendant of a signer of the oath is sufficient condition to join the Sons of the American Revolution.

References

Maryland in the American Revolution